Joseph Eugene Stiglitz (born February 9, 1943) is an American New Keynesian economist, a public policy analyst, and a full professor at Columbia University. He is a recipient of the Nobel Memorial Prize in Economic Sciences (2001) and the John Bates Clark Medal (1979). He is a former senior vice president and chief economist of the World Bank. He is also a former member and chairman of the (US president's) Council of Economic Advisers. He is known for his support of Georgist public finance theory and for his critical view of the management of globalization, of laissez-faire economists (whom he calls "free-market fundamentalists"), and of international institutions such as the International Monetary Fund and the World Bank.

In 2000, Stiglitz founded the Initiative for Policy Dialogue (IPD), a think tank on international development based at Columbia University. He has been a member of the Columbia faculty since 2001, and received the university's highest academic rank (university professor) in 2003. He was the founding chair of the university's Committee on Global Thought. He also chairs the University of Manchester's Brooks World Poverty Institute. He was a member of the Pontifical Academy of Social Sciences.  In 2009, the President of the United Nations General Assembly Miguel d'Escoto Brockmann, appointed Stiglitz as the chairman of the U.N. Commission on Reforms of the International Monetary and Financial System, where he oversaw suggested proposals and commissioned a report on reforming the international monetary and financial system. He served as chair of the international Commission on the Measurement of Economic Performance and Social Progress, appointed by President Sarkozy of France, which issued its report in 2010, Mismeasuring our Lives: Why GDP doesn't add up,  and currently serves as co-chair of its successor, the High Level Expert Group on the Measurement of Economic Performance and Social Progress. From 2011 to 2014, Stiglitz was president of the International Economic Association (IEA). He presided over the organization of the IEA triennial world congress held near the Dead Sea in Jordan in June 2014.

Stiglitz has received more than 40 honorary degrees, including degrees  from Cambridge and Harvard, and he has been decorated by several governments including Bolivia, South Korea, Colombia, Ecuador, and most recently France, where he was appointed as a member of the Legion of Honor, Officer.

In 2011, Stiglitz was named by Time magazine as one of the 100 most influential people in the world. Stiglitz's work focuses on income distribution from a Georgist perspective, asset risk management, corporate governance, and international trade. He is the author of several books, the latest being People, Power, and Profits (2019),  The Euro: How a Common Currency Threatens the Future of Europe (2016), The Great Divide: Unequal Societies and What We Can Do About Them (2015), Rewriting the Rules of the American Economy: An Agenda for Growth and Shared Prosperity (2015), and Creating a Learning Society: A New Approach to Growth Development and Social Progress (2014). He is also one of the 25 leading figures on the Information and Democracy Commission launched by Reporters Without Borders. According to the Open Syllabus Project, Stiglitz is the fifth most frequently cited author on college syllabi for economics courses.

Life and career

Stiglitz was born in Gary, Indiana. His mother was Charlotte (née Fishman), a schoolteacher, and his father was Nathaniel David Stiglitz, an insurance salesman. Stiglitz attended Amherst College, where he was a National Merit Scholar, active on the debate team, and president of the student government. During his senior year at Amherst College, he studied at the Massachusetts Institute of Technology (MIT), where he later pursued graduate work. In Summer 1965, he moved to the University of Chicago to do research under Hirofumi Uzawa who had received an NSF grant. He studied for his PhD from MIT from 1966 to 1967, during which time he also held an MIT assistant professorship. Stiglitz stated that the particular style of MIT economics suited him well, describing it as "simple and concrete models, directed at answering important and relevant questions."

From 1966 to 1970 he was a research fellow at the University of Cambridge. Stiglitz initially arrived at Fitzwilliam College, Cambridge as a Fulbright Scholar in 1965, and he later won a Tapp Junior Research Fellowship at Gonville and Caius College, Cambridge which was instrumental in shaping his understanding of Keynes and macroeconomic theory.  In subsequent years, he held academic positions at Yale, Stanford, Oxford - where he was Drummond Professor of Political Economy - and Princeton. Since 2001, Stiglitz has been a professor at Columbia University, with appointments at the Business School, the Department of Economics and the School of International and Public Affairs (SIPA), and is editor of The Economists' Voice journal with J. Bradford DeLong and Aaron Edlin.

He also gives classes for a double-degree program between Sciences Po Paris and École Polytechnique in 'Economics and Public Policy'. He has chaired The Brooks World Poverty Institute at the University of Manchester since 2005. Stiglitz is widely considered a New-Keynesian economist, although at least one economics journalist says his work cannot be so clearly categorised.

Stiglitz has played a number of policy roles throughout his career. He served in the Clinton administration as the chair of the President's Council of Economic Advisers (1995–1997). At the World Bank, he served as senior vice-president and chief economist from 1997 to 2000. He was fired by the World Bank for expressing dissent with its policies.

Stiglitz has advised American president Barack Obama, but has criticized the Obama Administration's financial-industry rescue plan. He said whoever designed the Obama administration's bank rescue plan is "either in the pocket of the banks or they're incompetent."

In October 2008, he was asked by the President of the United Nations General Assembly to chair a commission drafting a report on the reasons for and solutions to the financial crisis. In response, the commission produced the Stiglitz Report.

On July 25, 2011, Stiglitz participated in the "I Foro Social del 15M" organized in Madrid, expressing his support to 15M Movement protestors.

Stiglitz was the president of the International Economic Association from 2011 to 2014.

On September 27, 2015, the United Kingdom Labour Party announced that Stiglitz was to sit on its Economic Advisory Committee along with five other world-leading economists.

Contributions to economics
 After the 2018 mid-term elections in the United States he wrote a statement about the importance of economic justice to the survival of democracy worldwide.

Risk aversion
After getting his Ph.D. from M.I.T. in 1967, Stiglitz co-authored one of his first papers with Michael Rothschild for the Journal of Economic Theory in 1970. Stiglitz and Rothschild built upon works by economists such as Robert Solow on the concept of risk aversion. Stiglitz and Rothschild showed three plausible definitions of a variable X being 'more variable' than a variable Y were all equivalent - Y being equal to X plus noise, every risk-averse agent preferring Y to X, and Y having more weight in its tails, and that none of these were always consistent with X having a higher statistical variance than Y - a commonly used definition at the time. In a second paper, they analyzed the theoretical consequences of risk aversion in various circumstances, such as an individual's savings decisions and a firm's production decisions.

Henry George theorem
Stiglitz made early contributions to a theory of public finance stating that an optimal supply of local public goods can be funded entirely through capture of the land rents generated by those goods (when population distributions are optimal). Stiglitz dubbed this the 'Henry George theorem' in reference to the radical classical economist Henry George who famously advocated for land value tax. The explanation behind Stiglitz's finding is that rivalry for public goods takes place geographically, so competition for access to any beneficial public good will increase land values by at least as much as its outlay cost. Furthermore, Stiglitz shows that a single tax on rents is necessary to provide the optimal supply of local public investment. Stiglitz also shows how the theorem could be used to find the optimal size of a city or firm.

Information asymmetry
Stiglitz's most famous research was on screening, a technique used by one economic agent to extract otherwise private information from another. It was for this contribution to the theory of information asymmetry that he shared the Nobel Memorial Prize in Economics in 2001 "for laying the foundations for the theory of markets with asymmetric information" with George A. Akerlof and A. Michael Spence.

Much of Stiglitz's work on information economics demonstrates situations in which incomplete information prevents markets from achieving social efficiency. His paper with Andrew Weiss showed that if banks use interest rates to infer information about borrowers' types (adverse selection effect), or to encourage their actions following borrowing (incentive effect), then credit will be rationed below the optimal level, even in a competitive market. Stiglitz and Rothschild showed that in an insurance market, firms have an incentive to undermine a 'pooling equilibrium', where all agents are offered the same full-insurance policy, by offering cheaper partial insurance that would only be attractive to the low-risk types, meaning that a competitive market can only achieve partial coverage of agents. Stiglitz and Grossman  showed that trivially small information acquisition costs prevent financial markets from achieving complete informational efficiency, since agents will have an incentive to free-ride on others' information acquisition, and acquire this information indirectly by observing market prices.

Monopolistic competition 
Stiglitz, together with Avinash Dixit, created a tractable model of monopolistic competition that was an alternative to traditional perfect-competition models of general equilibrium. They showed that in the presence of increasing returns to scale, the entry of firms is socially too small. The model was extended to show that when consumers have a preference for diversity, entry can be socially too large. The modeling approach was also influential in the fields of trade theory, and industrial organization, and was used by Paul Krugman in his analysis of non-comparative advantage trading patterns.

Shapiro–Stiglitz efficiency wage model

Stiglitz also did research on efficiency wages, and helped create what became known as the "Shapiro–Stiglitz model" to explain why there is unemployment even in equilibrium, why wages are not bid down sufficiently by job seekers (in the absence of minimum wages) so that everyone who wants a job finds one, and to question whether the neoclassical paradigm could explain involuntary unemployment.  An answer to these puzzles was proposed by Shapiro and Stiglitz in 1984: "Unemployment is driven by the information structure of employment". Two basic observations undergird their analysis:

 Unlike other forms of capital, humans can choose their level of effort.
 It is costly for firms to determine how much effort workers are exerting.

A full description of this model can be found at the links provided. Some key implications of this model are:

 Wages do not fall enough during recessions to prevent unemployment from rising. If the demand for labour falls, this lowers wages. But because wages have fallen, the probability of 'shirking' (workers not exerting effort) has risen. If employment levels are to be maintained, through a sufficient lowering of wages, workers will be less productive than before through the shirking effect. As a consequence, in the model, wages do not fall enough to maintain employment levels at the previous state, because firms want to avoid excessive shirking by their workers. So, unemployment must rise during recessions, because wages are kept 'too high'.
 Possible corollary: Wage sluggishness. Moving from one private cost of hiring (w∗) to another private cost of hiring (w∗∗) will require each firm to repeatedly re-optimize wages in response to shifting unemployment rate. Firms cannot cut wages until unemployment rises sufficiently (a coordination problem).

The outcome is never Pareto efficient.

 Each firm employs too few workers, because the cost of employing too many workers would be faced by the firm alone, while the cost of unemployment is shared by the firm and its competitors, indeed it is shared by all firms that pay taxes in the country. This means that firms do not "internalize" the "external" cost of unemployment they do not factor how large-scale unemployment harms society when assessing their own costs.  This leads to a negative externality as marginal social cost exceeds the firm's marginal cost (MSC = Firm's Private Marginal Cost + Marginal External Cost of increased social unemployment)
 There are also positive externalities: each firm increases the asset value of unemployment for all other firms when they hire during recessions.  By creating hypercompetitive labor markets, all firms (the winners when laborers compete) experience an increase in value.  However, this effect of increased valuation is very unapparent, because the first problem (the negative externality of sub-optimal hiring) clearly dominates since the 'natural rate of unemployment' is always too high.

Practical implications of Stiglitz's theories
The practical implications of Stiglitz's work in political economy and their economic policy implications have been subject to debate. Stiglitz himself has evolved his political-economic discourse over time.

Objections to the adoption of positions suggested by Stiglitz's do not come from economics itself , but mostly from political scientists, especially in the field of sociology .  As David L. Prychitko discusses in his "critique" to Whither Socialism? (see below), although Stiglitz's main economic insight seems generally correct , it still leaves open great constitutional questions such as how the coercive institutions of the government should be constrained and what the relation is between the government and civil society.

Government

Clinton administration

Stiglitz joined the Clinton Administration in 1993, serving first as a member during 1993–1995, and was then appointed Chairman of the Council of Economic Advisers on June 28, 1995, in which capacity he also served as a member of the cabinet. He became deeply involved in environmental issues, which included serving on the Intergovernmental Panel on Climate Change, and helping draft a new law for toxic wastes (which was never passed).

Stiglitz's most important contribution in this period was helping define a new economic philosophy, a "third way", which postulated the important, but limited, role of government, that unfettered markets often did not work well, but that government was not always able to correct the limitations of markets. The academic research that he had been conducting over the preceding 25 years provided the intellectual foundations for this "third way".

When President Bill Clinton was re-elected, he asked Stiglitz to continue to serve as Chairman of the Council of Economic Advisers for another term. But he had already been approached by the World Bank to be its senior vice president for development policy and its chief economist, and he assumed that position after his CEA successor was confirmed on February 13, 1997.

As the World Bank began its ten-year review of the transition of the former Communist countries to the market economy it unveiled the failures of the countries that had followed the International Monetary Fund (IMF) shock therapy policies both in terms of the declines in GDP and increases in poverty that were even worse than the worst that most of its critics had envisioned at the onset of the transition. Clear links existed between the dismal performances and the policies that the IMF had advocated, such as the voucher privatization schemes and excessive monetary stringency.  Meanwhile, the success of a few countries that had followed quite different strategies suggested that there were alternatives that could have been followed. The US Treasury had put enormous pressure on the World Bank to silence his criticisms of the policies which they and the IMF had pursued.

Stiglitz always had a poor relationship with Treasury Secretary Lawrence Summers. In 2000, Summers successfully petitioned for Stiglitz's removal, supposedly in exchange for World Bank President James Wolfensohn's re-appointment an exchange that Wolfensohn denies took place. Whether Summers ever made such a blunt demand is questionable Wolfensohn claims he would "have told him to *** himself".

Stiglitz resigned from the World Bank in January 2000, a month before his term expired. The Bank's president, James Wolfensohn, announced Stiglitz's resignation in November 1999 and also announced that Stiglitz would stay on as Special Advisor to the President, and would chair the search committee for a successor.

In this role, he continued criticism of the IMF, and, by implication, the US Treasury Department. In April 2000, in an article for The New Republic, he wrote:

The article was published a week before the annual meetings of the World Bank and IMF and provoked a strong response. It proved too strong for Summers and, yet more lethally, Stiglitz's protector-of-sorts at the World Bank, Wolfensohn. Wolfensohn had privately empathised with Stiglitz's views, but this time was worried for his second term, which Summers had threatened to veto.  Stanley Fischer, deputy managing director of the IMF, called a special staff meeting and informed at that gathering that Wolfensohn had agreed to fire Stiglitz.  Meanwhile, the Bank's External Affairs department told the press that Stiglitz had not been fired, his post had merely been abolished.

In a September 19, 2008 radio interview, with Aimee Allison and Philip Maldari on Pacifica Radio's KPFA 94.1 FM in Berkeley, US, Stiglitz implied that President Clinton and his economic advisors would not have backed the North American Free Trade Agreement (NAFTA) had they been aware of stealth provisions, inserted by lobbyists, that they overlooked.

Initiative for Policy Dialogue

In July 2000, Stiglitz founded the Initiative for Policy Dialogue (IPD), with the support of the Ford, Rockefeller, McArthur, and Mott Foundations and the Canadian and Swedish governments, to enhance democratic processes for decision-making in developing countries and to ensure that a broader range of alternatives are on the table and more stakeholders are at the table.

Commission on the Measurement of Economic Performance and Social Progress
At the beginning of 2008, Stiglitz chaired the Commission on the Measurement of Economic Performance and Social Progress, also known as the Stiglitz-Sen-Fitoussi Commission, initiated by President Sarkozy of France. The Commission held its first plenary meeting on April 22–23, 2008, in Paris. Its final report was made public on September 14, 2009.

Commission of Experts on Reforms of the International Monetary and Financial System

In 2009, Stiglitz chaired the Commission of Experts on Reforms of the International Monetary and Financial System which was convened by the President of the United Nations General Assembly "to review the workings of the global financial system, including major bodies such as the World Bank and the IMF, and to suggest steps to be taken by Member States to secure a more sustainable and just global economic order". Its final report was released on September 21, 2009.

Greek debt crisis
In 2010, Professor Stiglitz acted as an advisor to the Greek government during the Greek debt crisis. He appeared on Bloomberg TV for an interview on the risks of Greece defaulting, in which he stated that he was very confident that Greece would not default. He went on to say that Greece was under "speculative attack" and though it had "short-term liquidity problems ... and would benefit from Solidarity Bonds", the country was "on track to meet its obligations".

The next day, during a BBC interview, Stiglitz stated that "there's no problem of Greece or Spain meeting their interest payments". He argued nonetheless, that it would be desirable and needed for all of Europe to make a clear statement of belief in social solidarity and that they "stand behind Greece". Confronted with the statement: "Greece's difficulty is that the magnitude of debt is far greater than the capacity of the economy to service", Stiglitz replied, "That's rather absurd".

In 2012, Stiglitz described the European austerity plans as a "suicide-pact".

Scotland
Since March 2012, Stiglitz has been a member of the Scottish Government's Fiscal Commission Working Group, which oversees the work to establish a fiscal and macroeconomic framework for an independent Scotland on behalf of the Scottish Council of Economic Advisers.

Together with Professors Andrew Hughes Hallett, Sir James Mirrlees and Frances Ruane, Stiglitz will "advise on the establishment of a credible Fiscal Commission which entrenches financial responsibility and ensures market confidence".

Labour Party
In July 2015, Stiglitz endorsed Jeremy Corbyn's campaign in the Labour Party leadership election. He said: "I am not surprised at all that there is a demand for a strong anti-austerity movement around increased concern about inequality. The promises of New Labour in the UK and of the Clintonites in the US have been a disappointment."

On September 27, 2015, it was announced that he had been appointed to the British Labour Party's Economic Advisory Committee, convened by Shadow Chancellor John McDonnell and reporting to Labour Party Leader Jeremy Corbyn, although he reportedly failed to attend the first meeting.

Economic views

Market efficiency 
For Stiglitz, there is no such thing as an invisible hand, in the sense that free markets lead to efficiency as if guided by unseen forces. According to Stiglitz:

In an interview in 2007, Stiglitz explained further:

The preceding claim is based on Stiglitz's 1986 paper, "Externalities in Economies with Imperfect Information and Incomplete Markets", which describes a general methodology to deal with externalities and for calculating optimal corrective taxes in a general equilibrium context. In the opening remarks for his prize acceptance at Aula Magna, Stiglitz said:

Support for anti-austerity movement in Spain
On July 25, 2011, Stiglitz participated in the "I Foro Social del 15M" organized in Madrid (Spain) expressing his support for the anti-austerity movement in Spain. During an informal speech, he made a brief review of some of the problems in Europe and in the United States, the serious unemployment rate and the situation in Greece. "This is an opportunity for economic contribution social measures", argued Stiglitz, who made a critical speech about the way authorities are handling the political exit to the crisis. He encouraged those present to respond to the bad ideas, not with indifference, but with good ideas. "This does not work, you have to change it", he said.

Criticism of rating agencies
Stiglitz has been critical of rating agencies, describing them as the "key culprit" in the financial crisis, noting "they were the party that performed the alchemy that converted the securities from F-rated to A-rated. The banks could not have done what they did without the complicity of the rating agencies."

Stiglitz co-authored a paper with Peter Orszag in 2002 titled "Implications of the New Fannie Mae and Freddie Mac Risk-Based Capital Standard" where they stated "on the basis of historical experience, the risk to the government from a potential default on GSE debt is effectively zero." However, "the risk-based capital standard ... may fail to reflect the probability of another Great Depression-like scenario."

Criticism of Trans-Pacific Partnership and Transatlantic Trade and Investment Partnership

Stiglitz warned that the Trans-Pacific Partnership (TPP) presented "grave risks" and it "serves the interests of the wealthiest."

Stiglitz also opposed the Transatlantic Trade and Investment Partnership (TTIP) trade deal between the European Union (EU) and the United States, and has argued that the United Kingdom should consider its withdrawal from the EU in the 2016 referendum on the matter if TTIP passes, saying that "the strictures imposed by TTIP would be sufficiently averse to the functioning of government that it would make me think over again about whether membership of the EU was a good idea".

Regulation
Stiglitz argues that relying solely on business self-interest as the means of achieving the well-being of society and economic efficiency is misleading, and that instead "What is needed is stronger norms, clearer understandings of what is acceptable and what is not and stronger laws and regulations to ensure that those that do not behave in ways that are consistent with these norms are held accountable".

Land value tax (Georgism)
Stiglitz argues that land value tax would improve the efficiency and equity of agricultural economies. Stiglitz believes that societies should rely on a generalized Henry George principle to finance public goods, protect natural resources, improve land use, and reduce the burden of rents and taxes on the poor while increasing productive capital formation. Stiglitz advocates taxing "natural resource rents at as close to 100 percent as possible" and that a corollary of this principle is that polluters should be taxed for "activities that generate negative externalities." Stiglitz therefore asserts that land value taxation is even better than its famous advocate Henry George thought.

Views on the eurozone
In a September 2016 interview Stiglitz stated that "the cost of keeping the Eurozone together probably exceeds the cost of breaking it up."

Views on free trade

Advice for the eurozone countries
In the 1990s, he wrote that "countries in North America and Europe should eliminate all tariffs and quotas (protectionist measures)". He now advises the eurozone countries to control their trade balance with Germany by means of export/import certificates or "trade chits" (a protectionist measure).

Citing Keynesian theory, he explains that trade surpluses are harmful: "John Maynard Keynes pointed out that surpluses lead to weak global aggregate demand – countries running surpluses exert a "negative externality" on trading partners. Indeed, Keynes believed it was surplus countries, far more than those in deficit, that posed a threat to global prosperity; he went so far as to advocate a tax on surplus countries". Indeed, from the beginning of 1930, Keynes stopped believing in free trade, denounced the theory of comparative advantage (the basis of free trade) and definitively adhered to protectionism. 

Stiglitz writes: "Germany's surplus means that the rest of Europe is in deficit. And the fact that these countries import more than they export contributes to the weakness of their economies". He thinks that surplus countries are getting richer at the expense of deficit countries. He notes that the euro is the cause of this deficit and that as the trade deficit declines GDP would rise and unemployment would fall: "The euro system means that Germany's exchange rate cannot increase compared to other euro area members. If the exchange rate were to rise, Germany would have more difficulty exporting and its economic model, based on strong exports, would cease. At the same time, the rest of Europe would export more, GDP would rise and unemployment would fall".

He also thinks that the rest of the world should impose a carbon-adjustment tax (a protectionist measure) on American exports that do not comply with global standard.

Advice for United States

Contrary to Keynesian theory and these analyses on the Eurozone, he argues that the United States should not rebalance the trade account, and that the country can no longer apply protectionist measures to protect or recreate the well-paying manufacturing jobs, saying: "The very Americans who have been among the losers of globalization stand to be among the losers of a reversal of globalization. History cannot be put into reverse".

On the other hand, he admits that as trade deficit declines, "GDP would rise and unemployment would fall", further stating: "...the fact that these countries are importing more than they are exporting contributes to their weak economies." He also notes that trade deficit is correlated with loss of manufacturing jobs: the increase in the "value of the dollar will lead to larger trade deficits and fewer manufacturing jobs".

Contrary to most economics historians, who argue that tariffs played only a minor if any role in the Great Depression, Stiglitz thinks that tariffs would be harmful to the United States economy today because it contributed to the Great Depression: "Following that, U.S. exports fell by some 50 percent—contributing to our Great Depression".

He denounces the "trickle-down" policies of liberalism and neoliberalism (laissez-faire) However, he calls for lowering trade barriers and promoting free trade (policy of deregulation of foreign trade which is part of the laissez-faire economic model).

According to him, it is not China (which has a large trade surplus) that makes "trade war", but the United States (which has a large trade deficit). He advises China to take sanctions against the United States. He warns that China could hit back at the U.S. "where hurts economically and politically" if the United States tries to raise tariffs, saying: "For example, cutbacks in purchases by China will lead to more unemployment in congressional districts that are vulnerable, influential, or both. ... China can retaliate anywhere it chooses, such as by using trade restrictions to target jobs in the congressional districts of those who support US tariffs. ... China may be more effective in targeting its retaliation to cause acute political pain. ... It's anybody's guess who can stand the pain better. Will it be the US, where ordinary citizens have already suffered for so long, or China, which, despite troubled times, has managed to generate growth in excess of 6%?"

Stiglitz does not want the United States to stop free trade. According to him, if China limits globalization, it will not hurt them, but if the United States stops with the process of free trade, it will be harmful. About China, according to him, if China depends less on economic globalization, it will not be negative for the country. He writes that the decline in exports from China to the U.S. may not "hurt them more than it hurt us" because "China’s government has far more control over the country’s economy than our government has over ours; and it is moving from export dependence to a model of growth driven by domestic demand." Regarding the United States, he writes the opposite and advice to apply the opposite of the Keynesian theory of trade deficits seen earlier: "Walking away from globalization may reduce our imports, but it will also reduce exports in tandem. And, almost surely, jobs will be destroyed faster than they will be created: there may even be fewer net manufacturing jobs". "[The] erection of barriers to trade and the movement of people and ideas more likely than not will be one in which the U.S. almost surely will lose."

In early 2017, he wrote that "the American middle class is indeed the loser of globalization" (the diminution of international trade regulations as well as tariffs, taxes) and "China, with its large emerging middle class, is among the big beneficiaries of globalization". "Thanks to globalisation, in terms of purchasing-power parity, China actually has already become the largest economy in the world in September 2015". However, contrary to what he wrote earlier, he later argued in February 2017 that the fall in wages and the disappearance of well-paid jobs in the United States, are not due to free trade or globalisation, but rather are inevitable collateral damage to the march of economic progress and technological innovation: "The United States can only push for advanced manufacturing, which requires higher skill sets and employs fewer people. Rising inequality, meanwhile, will continue ...". In addition, in December 5 2017,contrary to what he wrote earlier, he wrote that the drop in wages in the United States is due to the actions of multinational companies rather than the globalisation and the trade account imbalances between countries caused by free trade: "It was an agenda written by and for large multinational companies, at the expense of workers".

In 2016, he said he believes that the economic situation of the United States is critical: "As the economists Anne Case and Angus Deaton showed in their study published in December 2015, life expectancy among middle-age white Americans is declining, as rates of suicides, drug use, and alcoholism increase. A year later, the National Center for Health Statistics reported that life expectancy for the country as a whole has declined for the first time in more than 20 years." ... With the incomes of the bottom 90% having stagnated for close to a third of a century (and declining for a significant proportion), the health data simply confirmed that things were not going well for swaths of the country". ?".

Green economy 
Stiglitz has called for a transition to a green economy. He supported the Green New Deal. In 2019, he wrote that "The Green New Deal would stimulate demand, ensuring that all available resources were used; and the transition to the green economy would likely usher in a new boom. Trump’s focus on the industries of the past, like coal, is strangling the much more sensible move to wind and solar power. More jobs by far will be created in renewable energy than will be lost in coal." Stiglitz described the climate crisis as humanity's World War III.

Views on taxation 
Stiglitz maintained the super-rich should pay taxes up to 70% to help deal with increasing inequality.  Stiglitz stated a worldwide income tax rate of 70% on biggest earners "would clearly make sense".  Stiglitz maintained society would become more egalitarian and cohesive.  Stiglitz said a wealth taxes on fortunes acquired during many generations would have a larger influence. Stiglitz maintains most billionaires acquired much of their wealth through luck.  He maintains Elizabeth Warren proposing a 2% tax for people with assets of over $50m and 3% on those with overn $1bn was "very reasonable" and would raise significant revenues that could improve some United States problems.

Books
Along with his technical economic publications (over 300 technical articles), Stiglitz is the author of books on issues from patent law to abuses in international trade.

Whither Socialism? (1994) 
Whither Socialism? is based on Stiglitz's Wicksell Lectures, presented at the Stockholm School of Economics in 1990 and presents a summary of information economics and the theory of markets with imperfect information and imperfect competition, as well as being a critique of both free market and market socialist approaches (see Roemer critique, op. cit.).  Stiglitz explains how the neoclassical, or Walrasian model ("Walrasian economics" refers to the result of the process which has given birth to a formal representation of Adam Smith's notion of the "invisible hand", along the lines put forward by Léon Walras and encapsulated in the general equilibrium model of Arrow–Debreu), may have wrongly encouraged the belief that market socialism could work. Stiglitz proposes an alternative model, based on the information economics established by the Greenwald–Stiglitz theorems.

One of the reasons Stiglitz sees for the critical failing in the standard neoclassical model, on which market socialism was built, is its failure to consider the problems that arise from lack of perfect information and from the costs of acquiring information. He also identifies problems arising from its assumptions concerning completeness.

Globalization and Its Discontents (2002)
In Globalization and Its Discontents, Stiglitz argues that what are often called "developing economies" are, in fact, not developing at all, and puts much of the blame on the IMF.

Stiglitz bases his argument on the themes that his decades of theoretical work have emphasized: namely, what happens when people lack the key information that bears on the decisions they have to make, or when markets for important kinds of transactions are inadequate or don't exist, or when other institutions that standard economic thinking takes for granted are absent or flawed. Stiglitz stresses the point: "Recent advances in economic theory" (in part referring to his own work) "have shown that whenever information is imperfect and markets incomplete, which is to say always, and especially in developing countries, then the invisible hand works most imperfectly." As a result, Stiglitz continues, governments can improve the outcome by well-chosen interventions. Stiglitz argues that when families and firms seek to buy too little compared to what the economy can produce, governments can fight recessions and depressions by using expansionary monetary and fiscal policies to spur the demand for goods and services. At the microeconomic level, governments can regulate banks and other financial institutions to keep them sound. They can also use tax policy to steer investment into more productive industries and trade policies to allow new industries to mature to the point at which they can survive foreign competition. And governments can use a variety of devices, ranging from job creation to manpower training to welfare assistance, to put unemployed labor back to work and cushion human hardship.

Stiglitz argues that the IMF has done great damage through the economic policies it has prescribed that countries must follow in order to qualify for IMF loans, or for loans from banks and other private-sector lenders that look to the IMF to indicate whether a borrower is creditworthy. The organization and its officials, he argues, have ignored the implications of incomplete information, inadequate markets, and unworkable institutions all of which are especially characteristic of newly developing countries. As a result, Stiglitz argues, the IMF has often called for policies that conform to textbook economics but do not make sense for the countries to which the IMF is recommending them. Stiglitz seeks to show that these policies have been disastrous for the countries that have followed them.

The Roaring Nineties (2003)
The Roaring Nineties is Stiglitz's analysis of the boom and bust of the 1990s. Presented from an insider's point of view, firstly as chair of President Clinton's Council of Economic Advisors, and later as chief economist of the World Bank, it continues his argument on how misplaced faith in free-market ideology led to the global economic issues of today, with a perceptive focus on US policies.

New Paradigm for Monetary Economics (2003)

Fair Trade for All (2005)
In Fair Trade for All, authors Stiglitz and Andrew Charlton argue that it is important to make the trading world more development friendly. The idea is put forth that the present regime of tariffs and agricultural subsidies is dominated by the interests of former colonial powers and needs to change.  The removal of the bias toward the developed world will be beneficial to both developing and developed nations. The developing world is in need of assistance, and this can only be achieved when developed nations abandon mercantilist based priorities and work towards a more liberal world trade regime.

Making Globalization Work (2006)
Making Globalization Work surveys the inequities of the global economy, and the mechanisms by which developed countries exert an excessive influence over developing nations. Dr. Stiglitz argues that through tariffs, subsidies, an over-complex patent system and pollution, the world is being both economically and politically destabilised. Stiglitz argues that strong, transparent institutions are needed to address these problems. He shows how an examination of incomplete markets can make corrective government policies desirable.

Stiglitz is an exception to the general pro-globalisation view of professional economists, according to economist Martin Wolf. Stiglitz argues that economic opportunities are not widely enough available, that financial crises are too costly and too frequent, and that the rich countries have done too little to address these problems. Making Globalization Work has sold more than two million copies.

Stability with Growth (2006)
In Stability with Growth: Macroeconomics, Liberalization and Development, Stiglitz, José Antonio Ocampo (United Nations Under-Secretary-General for Economic and Social Affairs, until 2007), Shari Spiegel (Managing Director, Initiative for Policy Dialogue IPD), Ricardo Ffrench-Davis (Main Adviser, Economic Commission for Latin America and the Caribbean ECLAC) and Deepak Nayyar (Vice Chancellor, University of Delhi) discuss the current debates on macroeconomics, capital market liberalization and development, and develop a new framework within which one can assess alternative policies. They explain their belief that the Washington Consensus has advocated narrow goals for development (with a focus on price stability) and prescribed too few policy instruments (emphasizing monetary and fiscal policies), and places unwarranted faith in the role of markets. The new framework focuses on real stability and long-term sustainable and equitable growth, offers a variety of non-standard ways to stabilize the economy and promote growth, and accepts that market imperfections necessitate government interventions. Policy-makers have pursued stabilization goals with little concern for growth consequences, while trying to increase growth through structural reforms focused on improving economic efficiency. Moreover, structural policies, such as capital market liberalization, have had major consequences for economic stability. This book challenges these policies by arguing that stabilization policy has important consequences for long-term growth and has often been implemented with adverse consequences. The first part of the book introduces the key questions and looks at the objectives of economic policy from different perspectives. The third part presents a similar analysis for capital market liberalization.

The Three Trillion Dollar War (2008)
The Three Trillion Dollar War (co-authored with Linda Bilmes) examines the full cost of the Iraq War, including many hidden costs. The book also discusses the extent to which these costs will be imposed for many years to come, paying special attention to the enormous expenditures that will be required to care for very large numbers of wounded veterans. Stiglitz was openly critical of George W. Bush at the time the book was released.

Freefall (2010)

In Freefall: America, Free Markets, and the Sinking of the World Economy, Stiglitz discusses the causes of the 2008 recession/depression and goes on to propose reforms needed to avoid a repetition of a similar crisis, advocating government intervention and regulation in a number of areas. Among the policy-makers he criticises are George W. Bush, Larry Summers, and Barack Obama.

The Price of Inequality (2012)
From the jacket: As those at the top continue to enjoy the best health care, education, and benefits of wealth, they often fail to realize that, as Joseph E. Stiglitz highlights, "their fate is bound up with how the other 99 percent live ... It does not have to be this way.  In The Price of Inequality Stiglitz lays out a comprehensive agenda to create a more dynamic economy and fairer and more equal society"

The book received the Robert F. Kennedy Center for Justice and Human Rights 2013 Book Award, given annually to the book that "most faithfully and forcefully reflects Robert Kennedy's purposes his concern for the poor and the powerless, his struggle for honest and even-handed justice, his conviction that a decent society must assure all young people a fair chance, and his faith that a free democracy can act to remedy disparities of power and opportunity."

Creating a Learning Society: A New Approach to Growth, Development, and Social Progress (2014)
Creating a Learning Society (co-authored with Bruce C. Greenwald) casts light on the significance of this insight for economic theory and policy. Taking as a starting point Kenneth J. Arrow's 1962 paper "Learning by Doing", they explain why the production of knowledge differs from that of other goods and why market economies alone typically do not produce and transmit knowledge efficiently. Closing knowledge gaps and helping laggards learn are central to growth and development. But creating a learning society is equally crucial if we are to sustain improved living standards in advanced countries.

The Great Divide: Unequal Societies and What We Can Do About Them (2015)
From the jacket: In The Great Divide, Joseph E. Stiglitz expands on the diagnosis he offered in his best-selling book The Price of Inequality and suggests ways to counter America's growing problem. Stiglitz argues that inequality is a choice the cumulative result of unjust policies and misguided priorities.

The Euro: How a Common Currency Threatens the Future of Europe (2016)
From the description: "Stiglitz dismantles the prevailing consensus around what ails Europe, demolishing the champions of austerity while offering a series of plans that can rescue the continent--and the world--from further devastation."  According to book review aggregator Literary Hub, it received pan reviews.

People, Power and Profits: Progressive Capitalism for an Age of Discontent (2019)

From the description: "We all have the sense that the American economy―and its government―tilts toward big business, but as Joseph E. Stiglitz explains in his new book, People, Power, and Profits, the situation is dire. A few corporations have come to dominate entire sectors of the economy, contributing to skyrocketing inequality and slow growth. This is how the financial industry has managed to write its own regulations, tech companies have accumulated reams of personal data with little oversight, and our government has negotiated trade deals that fail to represent the best interests of workers. Too many have made their wealth through exploitation of others rather than through wealth creation. If something isn’t done, new technologies may make matters worse, increasing inequality and unemployment. Stiglitz identifies the true sources of wealth and of increases in standards of living, based on learning, advances in science and technology, and the rule of law. He shows that the assault on the judiciary, universities, and the media undermines the very institutions that have long been the foundation of America’s economic might and its democracy. Helpless though we may feel today, we are far from powerless. In fact, the economic solutions are often quite clear. We need to exploit the benefits of markets while taming their excesses, making sure that markets work for us―the U.S. citizens―and not the other way around. If enough citizens rally behind the agenda for change outlined in this book, it may not be too late to create a progressive capitalism that will recreate a shared prosperity. Stiglitz shows how a middle-class life can once again be attainable by all. An authoritative account of the predictable dangers of free market fundamentalism and the foundations of progressive capitalism, People, Power, and Profits shows us an America in crisis, but also lights a path through this challenging time."

Measuring What Counts; The Global Movement for Well-Being (2019)
Stiglitz and his co-authors point out that the interrelated crises of environmental degradation and human suffering of our current age demonstrate that "something is fundamentally wrong with the way we assess economic performance and social progress." They argue that using GDP as the chief measure of our economic health does not provide an accurate assessment of the economy or the state of the world and the people living in it.

Papers and conferences
Stiglitz wrote a series of papers and held a series of conferences explaining how such information uncertainties may have influence on everything from unemployment to lending shortages. As the chairman of the Council of Economic Advisers during the first term of the Clinton Administration and former chief economist at the World Bank, Stiglitz was able to put some of his views into action. For example, he was an outspoken critic of quickly opening up financial markets in developing countries. These markets rely on access to good financial data and sound bankruptcy laws, but he argued that many of these countries didn't have the regulatory institutions needed to ensure that the markets would operate soundly.

In July 2020, Stiglitz alongside Hamid Rashid, the chief of Global Economic Monitoring at the UN Department of Economic and Social Affairs, published a report, pointing out that the quantitative easing policy implemented by the US after the 2008 financial crisis, had "basically exported a debt bubble to developing countries".

Awards and honors
In addition to being awarded the Nobel Memorial prize, Stiglitz has over 40 honorary doctorates and at least eight honorary professorships as well as an honorary deanship.

Stiglitz was elected to the American Academy of Arts and Sciences in 1983, the National Academy of Sciences in 1988, and the American Philosophical Society in 1997.

In 2009, he received the Golden Plate Award of the American Academy of Achievement presented by Awards Council member Archbishop Desmond Tutu at an awards ceremony at St. George's Cathedral in Cape Town, South Africa.

He received the 2010 Gerald Loeb Awards for Commentary for "Capitalist Fools and Wall Street's Toxic Message".

In 2011, he was named by Foreign Policy magazine on its list of top global thinkers. In February 2012, he was awarded the Legion of Honor, in the rank of Officer, by the French ambassador in the United States François Delattre. Stiglitz was elected a Foreign Member of the Royal Society (ForMemRS) in 2009. Stiglitz was awarded the 2018 Sydney Peace Prize.

Personal life
Stiglitz married Jane Hannaway in 1978 but the couple later divorced. He married for the third time on October 28, 2004 to Anya Schiffrin, who works at the School of International and Public Affairs at Columbia University. He has four children and three grandchildren.

Selected bibliography

Books
 
 
 
 
 
 
 
 
 
 
 
  (Reprinted 2005.)
 
 
 
 
 
 
 
 
 
 
 
 
 
 
 Also as:

Book chapters
 
 
  Pdf version.

Selected scholarly articles
1970–1979
 
 
 
 
 
 
 

1980–1989
  Pdf version.
 
 
 

1990–1999
 
 
 
 
 
See also: Nicholas Georgescu-Roegen and Robert Solow
  Pdf version.
Also as: 

2000–2009
 
 

2010 onwards
  Pdf version.

Articles in popular press
 
 
See also: 
 
 
 
 
  Non-subscription version.
 
 
 
 
Review of the book: 
 
 
 
 
 
 
 Joseph E. Stiglitz, "Measuring What Matters: Obsession with one financial figure, GDP, has worsened people's health, happiness and the environment, and economists want to replace it", Scientific American, vol. 323, no. 2 (August 2020), pp. 24–31.

Video and online sources
 
  Five-part series on two DVD discs.
  Original French title Le monde selon Stiglitz.
 
Book details:

Papers
 Online access to Stiglitz published papers, at his own website.

See also
 Atkinson–Stiglitz theorem
 List of economists

References

External links

 
 Joseph E. Stiglitz | Columbia Business School Directory
  including the Prize Lecture December 8, 2001 Information and the Change in the Paradigm in Economics
 Profile and Papers at Research Papers in Economics/RePEc
 Publications at the National Bureau of Economic Research
 
 Column archives at Project Syndicate
 
 
 
 
 
 Of the 1%, by the 1%, for the 1%, Joseph E. Stiglitz, Vanity Fair, May 2011
 
 Three decades of neoliberal policies have decimated the middle class, our economy, and our democracy. Joseph Stiglitz for MarketWatch. May 13, 2019.

1943 births
Living people
Nobel laureates in Economics
American Nobel laureates
20th-century American non-fiction writers
20th-century American economists
21st-century American non-fiction writers
21st-century American economists
Alumni of Fitzwilliam College, Cambridge
Academics of the University of Manchester
American anti-globalization writers
American male non-fiction writers
Amherst College alumni
American Ashkenazi Jews
Columbia University faculty
American development economists
Drummond Professors of Political Economy
Academic staff of Sciences Po
Fellows of All Souls College, Oxford
Fellows of Gonville and Caius College, Cambridge
Fellows of the British Academy
Fellows of the Econometric Society
Foreign Members of the Royal Society
Foreign Members of the Russian Academy of Sciences
Georgist economists
Gerald Loeb Award winners for Columns, Commentary, and Editorials
Information economists
Intergovernmental Panel on Climate Change lead authors
Jewish American social scientists
Jewish American writers
Jewish American economists
Academic staff of Keio University
Keynesians
Labour Party (UK) people
MIT School of Humanities, Arts, and Social Sciences alumni
Institute for Advanced Study visiting scholars
Members of the Pontifical Academy of Social Sciences
Members of the United States National Academy of Sciences
New Keynesian economists
People in international development
Princeton University faculty
Public economists
Stanford University Department of Economics faculty
World Bank Chief Economists
Writers about globalization
Writers from Gary, Indiana
Yale University faculty
Center for Economic and Policy Research
Institute for New Economic Thinking
National Bureau of Economic Research
American officials of the United Nations
Economists from Indiana
Officiers of the Légion d'honneur
Fellows of the American Academy of Political and Social Science
Clinton administration cabinet members
Nancy L. Schwartz Memorial Lecture speakers
Jewish American members of the Cabinet of the United States
20th-century American male writers
21st-century American male writers
Chairs of the United States Council of Economic Advisers
Members of the American Philosophical Society
Fulbright alumni